Stephanie Subercaseaux Vergara (23 March 1984 – 21 January 2023) was a Chilean racing cyclist, who rode for UCI Women's Team . She rode in the women's road race event at the 2018 UCI Road World Championships.

Subercaseaux committed suicide in Las Condes on 21 January 2023. She was 38. Relatives claimed that her case was an example of "femicide suicide" due to the accusations of gender violence that she presented against her ex-boyfriend, fellow cyclist Antonio Cabrera.

References

External links
 

1984 births
2023 deaths
2023 suicides
Chilean female cyclists
Place of birth missing
20th-century Chilean women
21st-century Chilean women
Suicides in Chile